Little Italy is a neighborhood located in the North End of Bridgeport, Connecticut on Madison Avenue, near the Fairfield County Correctional Facility and Central High School, with a high Italian-American population.

History 
During the late 19th and early 20th centuries, many European immigrants moved to Bridgeport to work in the city's many large-scale industrial facilities. Many Italian arrivals during this time clustered together in the city's Central End and North End, particularly around Madison Avenue.

Present day 

The area around Madison Avenue is still referred to as "Little Italy", and remains home to many Italian restaurants. However, in recent years, many of the neighborhood's Italian restaurants have moved to surrounding towns following the de-industrialization of Bridgeport. The area now also has a significant Portuguese population.

References

See also

History of Bridgeport, Connecticut

Italian-American culture in Connecticut
Little Italys in the United States
Neighborhoods in Connecticut
Geography of Bridgeport, Connecticut
Portuguese neighborhoods in the United States